The Fabrique d'armes Émile et Léon Nagant, later known as L. Nagant & Cie, Liège, was a Belgian firm established in Liège in 1859 as a manufacturer of firearms and later automobiles.

History 
The company was originally founded by brothers Émile (1830–1902) and Léon (1833–1900) as an industrial repair business, which included repairing damaged firearms. In 1867, the Nagant brothers entered the firearms market when their company received a license to produce 5,000 Remington Rolling Block rifles for the Papal Zouaves; they later adapted the rolling-block design to produce double-barreled shotguns under the name "Remington-Nagant". The company is best known for Émile's contribution to the design of the Mosin–Nagant Russian service rifle, adopted in 1891. This introduction to the Tsar's military administration led to the adoption, in 1895, of the Nagant M1895 revolver (designed by Léon) as their standard-issue sidearm. The following year, Émile's progressive blindness led to his retirement from the firm which was renamed to "L. Nagant & Cie, Liège", with Léon being joined by his sons Charles and Maurice.

Car manufacture

Later, the firm moved to the manufacture of automobiles; Nagant made cars under licence of the French firm Rochet-Schneider. Nagant cars were made from 1900 to 1928. The firm was purchased by Impéria in 1931.

References

Firearm designers
Defunct firearms manufacturers
Defunct motor vehicle manufacturers of Belgium
Car manufacturers of Belgium
Liège
Companies based in Liège Province
Defunct manufacturing companies of Belgium